Oreoleuciscus angusticephalus, the narrow-headed Altai osman, is a species of cyprinid in the genus Oreoleuciscus. Its young feed on plankton while adults feed predominantly on fish. It has a lifespan of over 40 years and takes 8–9 years to mature.

References

Cyprinid fish of Asia
Fish of Mongolia